R34 may refer to:
 R34 (New York City Subway car)
 R34 (South Africa)
 HM Airship R.34, a rigid airship of the Royal Air Force
 , a destroyer of the Royal Navy
 Nissan Skyline (R34), a mid-size car
 Nissan Skyline GT-R (R34), a sports car
 R34: Causes burns, a risk phrase
 Renard R.34, a Belgian trainer biplane
 Rule 34, a statement that pornography is concerned in every conceivable topic